The history of the Portland Timbers stretches back to 1975, when the original Timbers club joined the North American Soccer League, to the present club that plays in Major League Soccer.

Franchise timeline

NASL (1975–1982) 

In January 1975, the North American Soccer League awarded an expansion franchise to Portland, Oregon. The name was selected on March 8 from more than 3,000 entries in an open contest. In their inaugural season of 1975, the Timbers went to the championship game, Soccer Bowl '75, but lost to the Tampa Bay Rowdies 2–0.  It was during this season that the Timbers endeared themselves to the City and Portland became known as "Soccer City USA".  While the Timbers boasted some of the league's best fan support, they sometimes struggled on the field.  Despite going to the championship game in their first season, they missed the playoffs in 1976 and 1977.  In 1978, they went to the Conference Finals before falling to the New York Cosmos.

The team folded at the end of the 1982 season as player salaries outpaced team revenue.  These Timbers established soccer as a sport in the greater Portland area.  Their legacy lives on in the current Timbers following and the many thousands who continue to play and follow the game.  Many of these Timbers continued to live in the area after their playing careers and helped establish the soccer as a vital local sport.

F.C. Portland (1985–1990) 

In 1985, F.C. Portland joined with three other independent clubs, the U.S. based F.C. Seattle and San Jose Earthquakes and the Canadian Victoria Riptides in a home and away round robin tournament, known as the Western Alliance Challenge Series. The four teams also played the Canadian Edmonton Brick Men and the Canadian national team.  The games against the Brick Men counted in the standings which determined the end of series champions.

F.C. Portland had the honor of hosting the first game of the series, against Seattle.  The game, played in Portland's Civic Center, attracted 2,906 fans.

F.C. Portland also played a game against the Houston Dynamos in Houston.

After the success of 1985, the three U.S. teams elected to form a league, which they named the Western Soccer Alliance.  While the Victoria Riptides opted out of the league, the Edmonton Brick Men joined the alliance, along with the Hollywood Kickers, Los Angeles Heat and  San Diego Nomads.  The teams continued the first year practice of playing outside teams (Manchester City and Dundee this year) with results counting in the alliance standings.

F.C. Portland saw a significant improvement over the previous season.  Behind the production of forwards Brent Goulet (league leading 9 goals and 2 assists), and Mark Miller (7 goals and  5 assists), the team finished second in the standings with a 6-6-2 record.   At the time, Goulet played for Warner Pacific College, a local school.  He played with F.C. Portland as an amateur.

In 1986, former Timbers player Clive Charles began coaching the University of Portland (U.P.) men's soccer team, bringing this team to national prominence.  This led to an infusion of U.P. players into F.C. Portland in later years.

In 1987, Edmonton dropped from the alliance to join the Canadian Soccer League and the Hollywood Kickers changed their name to the California Kickers.  The league also reduced the number of games from 12 to 10.  Despite Brent Goulet's outstanding play, which led to his selection as the season MVP, F.C. Portland finished fourth in the standings and missed out on the alliance's first playoff, won by the San Diego Nomads.

At the end of the season, the team lost Goulet when he finished his four years at Warner Pacific College and signed with British club AFC Bournemouth.

1988 saw F.C. Portland drop to the bottom of the end of year standings despite once again having the alliance's leading scorer, Scott Benedetti with 8 goals and no assists.  At the time Benedetti was between his junior and senior year playing soccer for Clive Charles at the University of Portland. The alliance kept the same teams as the 1987 season, but played 12 games, including games against Canadian Soccer League teams, Calgary Kickers and Vancouver 86ers.  F.C. Portland finished 1-11.

This year the alliance named an All Star team.  Ironically, not only did Portland have the alliance's top scorer, but also had its goalkeeper, Todd Strobeck, named to the alliance's All Star team.

In 1989, F.C. Portland went through several changes.  First, Art Dixon, a local businessman, took control of F.C. Portland and renamed it the Portland Timbers.  Dixon was a long time Timbers fan, holding season tickets from 1979 through the team's last season in 1982.  Dixon brought more than a name change, he also injected money and a higher level of professionalism into the team, bringing former Timbers great John Bain back as a player/coach.  Then, the Western Soccer Alliance became the Western Soccer League (WSL).  More importantly for Portland, the WSL added three new teams, Real Santa Barbara, Arizona Condors and Sacramento Senators.  To accommodate the new teams, the Western Soccer League split into two divisions – North and South.  The Portland Timbers joined the former San Jose Earthquakes, now known as the San Francisco Bay Blackhawks; the F.C. Seattle, now known as the Seattle Storm; and the new Sacramento Senators in the North Division.

Portland made yet another wild swing in the standings from the previous season.  Improving from 1-11, Portland finished the year at 11-5 and tied with the Blackhawks for the North Division lead.  The Blackhawks won the division championship, and the playoff berth, based on goal differential.

The team continued its tradition of placing its players on the end of year honors lists.  Goalkeeper Kasey Keller was selected as the league's MVP. Additionally, Portland placed Keller, midfielder/coach John Bain and forward Scott Benedetti on the WSL All Star team.  At the time, Keller was also playing NCAA soccer with the University of Portland.

In February 1990, the WSL announced it had reached a merger agreement with the American Soccer League, which had teams along the east coast.  The new league was named the American Professional Soccer League.  The APSL was split into East and West Conferences, both with North and South Divisions.  The Portland Timbers remained in the North Division, which also had the San Francisco Bay Blackhawks, Seattle Storm and newly established Salt Lake Sting and Colorado Foxes.

This year, Portland's final, the team finished with a 10–10 record and out of playoff contention.  This was also the first year the team failed to garner any individual player honors.  Its leading goal scorer, Shawn Medved with 10 goals and 2 assists, was seventh on the league's scoring list.  Kasey Keller had also moved on after playing in the 1990 FIFA World Cup and then signing with British club Millwall and Scott Benedetti had transferred to Seattle.

At the end of the season, the high hopes which had come with the merger between the WSL and APSL crashed.  Over half of the teams from the 1990 season, including Portland, would not return for the 1991 season.  Team owner Art Dixon folded the team, having lost more than $500,000 over the two years he owned the team.

USL (2001–2010) 

Through the 2003 season, the Timbers compiled an inconsistent record, qualifying for league playoffs two out of the three years.  Nonetheless, they established themselves as one of the best-drawing teams in the A-League, averaging attendance above 5,000 in each of their four years of existence.

In the 2004 season, the Timbers finished first in the Western Conference, with a record of 18 wins, 7 losses, and 3 draws (57 points).  However, they were eliminated in the first round of the playoffs by their long-standing rival, the Seattle Sounders.

In, 2005, the Timbers managed an end of the year playoff run, ended by rival club Seattle Sounders.  However, many exciting moments went along with the 2005 season, including a 6-1 thumping of the Atlanta Silverbacks on September 8, 2005; Portland being the only team to give the Montreal Impact a home loss, and Timbers players Scot Thompson, Hugo Alcaraz-Cuellar, and Dan Antoniuk winning league awards.

2006 was a very disappointing season for many reasons for the Portland Timbers, and their fans. Chris Agnello's single season as Timbers manager was one of the worst in club history. The Timbers finished tied for last in the table with a franchise worst 7-15-6 (27 points) record. The offensive production was last in the league as the club only netted 25 goals, and the Timbers lost their derby with heated rival Seattle Sounders.

2007 had many moments for the Timbers. Portland finished second in the league, with first going to rival Seattle Sounders. They enjoyed successful friendlies against Preston North End (2-1), Club Necaxa (1-0) and Toronto FC (4-1) whilst drawing even with the A.C. Milan Primavera squad (1-1) and winning on penalties, and went unbeaten at home during the regular season.

2008 was a disappointing year to most Timbers' fans for many reasons, although this was offset by the record high season attendances. The team finished dead last with a 7-13-10 record, scored a league worst 26 goals, while conceding 33. However, the 2008 Portland Timbers attendance grew 25.5% averaging 8,567 fans (second in the USL-1 behind Montreal Impact), and Cameron Knowles won an All-League Second Team spot.

2009 was a record-setting season for the Timbers. They went unbeaten for a USL-1 record 24 matches in a row, which started following a 1–0 loss to Vancouver in the first game of the season, and ended with a Sept 3 defeat to Rochester Rhinos at PGE Park. They finished their season at the top of the table (16-4-10 58 points) winning The Commissioner's Cup and a first round bye in the playoffs. With their 3–1 victory over the Miami FC Blues, the Timbers also were the first team to clinch a playoff spot in the 2009 season.  The Timbers were eliminated from the playoffs in their first two games (1-2, 3-3) on goal aggregate to Cascadia rival Vancouver Whitecaps.

MLS (2011–) 

The announcement was the culmination of a nearly two-year-long process for Merritt Paulson, dating back at least to May 2007, when Paulson led a group that bought the Portland Beavers and the USL Timbers. The group included former Treasury Secretary Henry Paulson (Meritt Paulson's father) who holds a 20% stake.  The biggest issue for the city of Portland was that due to league concerns about seating configuration, field surface, and scheduling, obtaining an MLS franchise would require a new stadium.

In October 2007, Paulson told PGE Park could be upgraded for about $20 million, and a new baseball stadium (with 8,000 to 9,000 seats) would cost about $30 million. By November 2008, Paulson told The New York Times he expected Portland taxpayers would spend $85 million to "build a new baseball stadium for his Beavers and renovate PGE Park—just remodeled in 2001 at a cost to taxpayers of $38.5 million—for soccer", and that in exchange, he would spend $40 million for the franchise fee to bring a new Major League Soccer team to Portland.  MLS was in support of the proposal, wanting to continue to expand the number of owners in the league (for a while, all of its teams were owned by three men: Phil Anschutz, Lamar Hunt, and Robert Kraft).

Supporting the MLS franchise raised numerous issues for Mayor Sam Adams and the Portland City Council, in spite of a subsequent commitment from Paulson that Peregrine LLC would contribute $12.5 million towards stadium construction.  In order to justify the $88.8 million of city dollars Peregrine LLC wanted for PGE Park renovation and Beavers relocation, the city had to assume that Paulson's revenue projections were accurate (e.g. "2011 ticket revenues from baseball will be 95 percent higher than revenues in 2008"), cut some street maintenance and cleaning, and cut about $150,000 from the streetlight budget.  The city's use of existing urban renewal district funds and establishment of a new district that "stretches the statutory requirement that a district suffer urban blight" creates budgetary and potentially legal problems and drain millions of dollars from Multnomah County's general fund.

The Portland franchise was announced as Major League Soccer's eighteenth team on March 20, 2009 by Commissioner Don Garber. The announcement occurred in the middle of the first and second-round games of the 2009 NCAA Men's Division I Basketball Tournament being held in Portland the same week.  The announcement noted that the team would retain the Portland Timbers name.

The team owner is Peregrine Sports, LLC, a group led by Merritt Paulson.  Paulson is also the head of Shortstop LLC, which previously owned the USL-1 Timbers as well as the Pacific Coast League's Portland Beavers.

Former MLS forward and assistant coach John Spencer was named the first head coach of the MLS-era Timbers on August 10, 2010.  It was also announced that Gavin Wilkinson, head coach of the USL-1/USSF D-2 Timbers, will stay on as the general manager/technical director of the MLS side.

Honors

League

NASL 

Soccer Bowl/League Championship
 Runner-up (1): 1975
Regular Season
 Winner (1): 1975
Division Championship
 Winner (1): 1975

A-League/USL 

Regular Season
 Winner (2): 2004, 2009
 Runner-up (1): 2007
Conference Championship
 Winner (1): 2004

MLS 
 Winner (1): 2015 MLS Cup
 Runner-up (2): 2018, 2021

Other 
Columbia Cup vs. Vancouver Whitecaps
 Winner: 1975
Rose Festival Cup vs. Seattle Sounders
 Winner (4): 1977, 1978, 1979, 1981
 Runner-up: 1980
Mountain Bar Cup vs. Seattle Sounders
 Runner-up (3): 1978, 1979, 1980

Cascadia Cup
 Winner (3): 2009, 2010, 2012
 Runner-up (3): 2004, 2005, 2011

Personnel

Ownership History

Managerial History

Notes
A.  It was announced on March 30, 2005 that Portland Baseball Investment Group, headed by Abe Alizadeh, had agreed to buy the Timbers and the Portland Beavers baseball club from the Pacific Coast League. The Timbers referred to Alizadeh as the Majority Owner in press releases throughout the 2005 and 2006 seasons. However, the sale was not officially completed until June 16, 2006.

References 

Portland Timbers
Portland Timbers